Harry Gasser (December 2, 1936 – April 3, 2014) was a Philippine news presenter Gasser was the face of Philippine evening news at the time of the regime of Ferdinand Marcos.

Career
He started his journalistic career as an anchor of Balita Ngayon on ABS-CBN from 1969 to 1972. Following the closure of the network during Martial Law, Gasser transferred to BBC-2 where he anchored BBC Primetime News from 1973 to 1977. He was the main anchor of RPN's NewsWatch during the Marcos regime. He also worked with Radio Veritas as news manager and later moved on to ABS-CBN to anchor TV Patrol in Cebu from 1998-2001.

NewsWatch Evening Cast, the first English-language early evening newscast was anchored by Gasser, together with Loren Legarda and Pat Lazaro, later it was anchored by Cielo Villaluna and Cristina Pecson.
NewsWatch Prime Cast, a late night edition was also anchored by Gasser, Cathy Santillan, and later, Eric Eloriaga.

He was also overseas program manager and news manager of Radio Veritas.

Personal life
Gasser was married to veteran comedian Flora Gasser. They had two children.  Loren Legarda, who co-anchored NewsWatch with Gasser on RPN, noted that "he was a proud Cebuano."

Filmography
 Paalam... Bukas ang kasal ko (Goodbye ... Tomorrow is my wedding) (1986) 
 Sa mata ng balita': 50 taong pamamahayag sa telebisyon (In the eyes of the news: 50 years of journalism on television) (2003)

Awards
 Lifetime Achievement award given by the Philippine Movie Press Club

References

External links
 Veteran news anchor Harry Gasser, 76, passes away GMA News Online, April 3, 2014

1936 births
2014 deaths
Filipino television news anchors
RPN News and Public Affairs people
People from Manila
People from Carcar